Buthacus is a genus of scorpion of the family Buthidae. It is distributed across northern and western Africa, Israel, Palestine, Jordan, Syria, the Arabian Peninsula, Iraq, Iran, Afghanistan, and Pakistan.

Taxonomy 

The genus was introduced in 1908 by A.A. Birula, originally as a subgenus of the genus Buthus. It was elevated to genus rank by M. Vachon in 1949.

Diversity

Species of Buthacus are very similar to each other and have been considered subspecies in some examples. At least 22 species are known, some of them are disputed:

 Buthacus arenicola (Simon, 1885)
 Buthacus birulai Lourenço, 2006
 Buthacus buettikeri Hendrixson, 2006
 Buthacus calviceps (Pocock, 1900)
 Buthacus clevai Lourenço, 2001
 Buthacus ehrenbergi Kovařík, 2005
 Buthacus foleyi Vachon, 1949
 Buthacus huberi Lourenço, 2001
 Buthacus leptochelys (Ehrenberg, 1829) (Also Known As "Egyptian green scorpion ")
 Buthacus macrocentrus (Ehrenberg, 1828)
 Buthacus mahraouii Lourenço, 2004
 Buthacus maliensis Lourenço & Qi, 2007
 Buthacus nigerianus Lourenço & Qi, 2006
 Buthacus nigroaculeatus Levy, Amitai & Shulov, 1973
 Buthacus occidentalis Lourenço, 2000
 Buthacus pakistanensis Lourenço & Qi, 2006
 Buthacus spatzi (Birula, 1911)
 Buthacus striffleri Lourenço, 2004
 Buthacus villiersi Vachon, 1949
 Buthacus williamsi Lourenço & Leguin, 2009
 Buthacus ziegleri Lourenço, 2000

General characteristics 

Small to moderately sized scorpions (40–75 mm). Most species are yellow, some are brownish, yellow-grayish or yellow-greenish colored. They show a rather slim habitus with long walking legs and a slender metasoma; pedipalp chelae very gracile and elongate. Cephalothorax smooth or with very weak carinae.

Toxicity 

As in other buthids the venom in at least some species of Buthacus is relatively potent and can be of medical importance to humans.

Habitat 

Most species live in arid, rocky and sandy desert habitats, some in semi-arid steppe environments. As most other scorpions they shelter from daylight in rock crevices or burrows.

References

External links 

Images of Buthacus leptochelys and Buthacus sp.. Exotics.nl

Buthidae
Scorpions of Africa